There are eighty-five colleges and universities in the U.S. state of Wisconsin that are listed under the Carnegie Classification of Institutions of Higher Education. The University of Wisconsin–Madison (UW–Madison) is the state's largest public post-secondary institution, with a fall 2010 enrollment of 42,180 students. It is the flagship of the University of Wisconsin System, which includes 25 other campuses.

Marquette University in Milwaukee is the state's largest private university, with a fall 2010 enrollment of 11,806 students. With 19,827 in attendance, Milwaukee Area Technical College is the largest technical college of Wisconsin. Wisconsin School of Professional Psychology, also in Milwaukee, is the state's smallest institution, with an enrollment of 75 for fall 2010. Waukesha-based Carroll University is the state's oldest four-year post-secondary institution as it was founded on January 31, 1846, two years before Wisconsin achieved statehood. Beloit College, located in the city of Beloit, was established two days later on February 2.

Medical College of Wisconsin and University of Wisconsin School of Medicine and Public Health are the state's only two medical schools. The state's two law schools, Marquette University Law School and University of Wisconsin Law School, are both accredited by the American Bar Association. The majority of Wisconsin's post-secondary institutions are accredited by the Higher Learning Commission, but 15 have received accreditation from the Accrediting Council for Independent Colleges and Schools (ACICS). Most are accredited by multiple agencies, such as the National League for Nursing (NLNAC), the Commission on Collegiate Nursing Education (CCNE), the American Dental Association (ADA), the American Physical Therapy Association (APTA), and the National Council for Accreditation of Teacher Education (NCATE).

Extant institutions

Research universities

Doctoral/Professional universities

Master's colleges and universities

Baccalaureate colleges

Baccalaureate/Associate's colleges

Associate's colleges

Special-focus institutions

Tribal colleges

Defunct institutions

Key

See also
 Higher education in the United States
 List of college athletic programs in Wisconsin
 List of American institutions of higher education

Notes

References

External links
Department of Education listing of accredited institutions in Wisconsin

Wisconsin
 
Colleges and universities